Alexis Usbaldo Silva García (born December 12, 1992 in Celaya, Guanajuato), known as Alexis Silva, is a Mexican professional association football (soccer) player who plays for Irapuato F.C.

External links
 

Living people
1992 births
Mexican footballers
People from Celaya
Liga MX players
Association football defenders
Club Celaya footballers
Irapuato F.C. footballers
La Piedad footballers
Albinegros de Orizaba footballers
Atlético Reynosa footballers